Kjersti Beck (born 5 September 1979) is a Norwegian handball goalkeeper playing for BM Mar Valencia and the Norwegian National Team.

She earlier played for Byåsen I.L., and has also worked as a Radio host for Radio Adressa, and is a qualified physical therapist.

She has played 28 games for the National Team, and won the European Championship in 2004.

References
 Fansite

1979 births
Living people
Norwegian female handball players
World Games bronze medalists
Competitors at the 2013 World Games